Phtheochroa thiana is a species of moth of the family Tortricidae. It is found in Russia, in the Tian Shan mountains and in  Asia Minor.

References

Moths described in 1900
Phtheochroa